The Roman Africans or African Romans were the ancient populations of Roman North Africa that had a Romanized culture, some of whom spoke their own variety of Latin as a result. They existed from the Roman conquest until their language gradually faded out after the Arab conquest of North Africa in the Early Middle Ages (approximately the 8th century AD).

Roman Africans lived in all the coastal cities of contemporary Tunisia, Western Libya, Eastern Algeria, as well as West Algeria and Northern Morocco, though in a more limited fashion, mainly concentrated in the coastal areas and large towns. The area between East Algeria and Western Libya became known under Arab rule as Ifriqiya, an Arabized version of the name of the Roman province of Africa.

Many Roman Africans were generally local Berbers or Punics, but also the descendants of the populations that came directly from Rome and Roman Italy itself or the diverse regions of the Empire as legionaries and senators.

Language

Characteristics 

The Roman-Africans first adopted the Roman pantheon under the rule of the Roman Republic, but then were one of the first provinces to convert to Christianity. Among their best known figures were Saint Felicita, Saint Perpetua, Saint Cyprian and Saint Augustine. Unlike the so-called Mauri that mostly inhabited the westernmost part of Northwest Africa and were barely romanised, Roman Africans (like Septimus Severus or saint Aurelius Augustinus) had Latin names in addition to speaking Latin.

The African province was amongst the wealthiest regions in the Empire (rivaled only by Egypt, Syria and Italy itself) and as a consequence people from all over the Empire migrated into the province. Large numbers of Roman Army veterans settled in Northwest Africa on farming plots promised for their military service.

Even so, the Roman military presence of Northwest Africa was relatively small, consisting of about 28,000 troops and auxiliaries in Numidia. Starting in the 2nd century AD, these garrisons were composed mostly of local inhabitants. A sizable Latin speaking population developed from a multinational background, sharing the northwest African region with those speaking Punic and Berber languages. Imperial security forces began to be drawn from the local population, including the Berbers.

By the end of the Western Roman Empire nearly all of the African province was fully Romanized, according to Theodor Mommsen in his The Provinces of the Roman Empire. Roman Africans enjoyed a high level of prosperity. Such prosperity (and romanisation) touched partially even the populations living outside of the Roman limes (mainly the Garamantes and the Getuli).

The Roman African populations kept their Latin language, as well as their Nicene-Chalcedonian Christian religion, under the Germanic Vandal occupation, the Byzantine restoration and the Islamic conquest, where they progressively converted to Islam until the near-extinction of Christianity in the Maghreb in the 12th century under the Almohads. The African Romance Latin dialect constituted a significant substratum of the modern varieties of the Berber languages and Maghrebi Arabic.

After their conquest, the Muslim conquerors distinguished three distinct categories of population in Northwest Africa: the foreign population from Rūm ((Eastern) Roman Empire), mainly composing the military and administrative elite, who generally spoke Greek; the Afāriqah: the Roman Africans, the native Latin-speaking community mostly concentrated in the urban areas; and finally the Barbar ( بربر ): that is, the Berber farmers that populated most of the rural countryside.

See also
 African Romance
 Roman Africa (disambiguation)
 Roman colonies in Berber Africa

References

Bibliography
Gibbon. Edward Decline and Fall of the Roman Empire (1888)
Southern, Pat. The Roman Empire from Severus to Constantine Routledge. London, 2001

Algeria in the Roman era
Ancient peoples of Africa
 
Latin language
Maghreb
Tunisia in the Roman era
Africa (Roman province)
Libya in the Roman era